Upper Stevens Creek Falls is a waterfall in the Mount Rainier National Park in Pierce County, Washington. Although virtually ignored, it is said to be one of the greatest waterfalls in the state.

The falls are fed by Stevens Creek, which is a tributary of the Cowlitz River. Significant off-trail travel, which is prohibited, is required to view this waterfall properly.

See also
 Fairy Falls

References

Mount Rainier National Park
Waterfalls of Pierce County, Washington
Waterfalls of Washington (state)